Kausar Fateh Khel is a town and union council in Bannu District of Khyber-Pakhtunkhwa.
Naser fateh khel bannu

References

Union councils of Bannu District
Populated places in Bannu District